Jeffrey Hopkins (born 1940) is an American Tibetologist. He is Emeritus professor of Tibetan and Buddhist Studies at the University of Virginia, where he taught for more than three decades since 1973. He has authored more than twenty-five books about Tibetan Buddhism, among them the highly influential Meditation on Emptiness, which appeared in 1983, offering a pioneering exposition of Prasangika-Madyamika thought in the Geluk tradition. From 1979 to 1989 he was the Dalai Lama's chief interpreter into English and he played a significant role in the development of the Free Tibet Movement. In 2006 he published his English translation of a major work by the Jonangpa lama, Dolpopa, on the Buddha Nature and Emptiness called Mountain Doctrine.

Works
 
Maps of the Profound: Jam-Yang-Shay-Ba's Great Exposition of Buddhist and Non-Buddhist Views on the Nature of Reality
Tsong-kha-pa's Final Exposition of Wisdom
Emptiness Yoga: The Tibetan Middle Way
Emptiness in the Mind-Only School of Buddhism
Meditation on Emptiness
Absorption in No External World: 170 Issues in Mind-Only Buddhism (Dynamic Responses to Dzong-ka-ba's the Essence of Eloquence)
Mountain Doctrine: Tibet's Fundamental Treatise on Other-Emptiness and the Buddha Matrix

Translations

 Health Through Balance: An Introduction to Tibetan Medicine (1986),  Yeshi Dhonden,

Notes and references

External links
 Audio Interview Series on BuddhistGeeks.com
 Jeffrey Hopkins - UVA Tibet Center
 UMA Tibet's Collection of Jeffrey Hopkins Video Lectures

Tibetologists
Tibetan Buddhists from the United States
Gelug Buddhists
Living people
1940 births
University of Virginia faculty